Stewart Tresilian (9 January 1904 – 20 May 1962) was a British mechanical engineer, who played a significant role in the early development of British aero engines during World War II.

Early life
He gained a BA degree in Engineering from the University of Cambridge.

Career

Rolls-Royce
In the 1920s he worked at Rolls-Royce on aero-engines. In the early 1930s he worked as the chief assistant to Arthur Rowledge at Rolls-Royce on the R engine.

Templewood Engineering 
For around a year, from 1938 to 1939, he worked as an independent consultant under the name 'Templewood Engineering', an owned subsidiary of High Duty Alloys Ltd. Wallace C. Devereux set up this offshoot company in order to market their Hiduminium range of high-performance aluminium alloys to the motor-racing industry. One of Tresilian's innovations was to encourage the use of these alloys as extrusions, as well as the previous forgings.

Armstrong Siddeley
In 1939 he became the Chief Engineer of Armstrong Siddeley, based north of Coventry (now Rolls-Royce Ansty).

British Racing Motors
Tresilian designed an oversquare twin-cam 2.5-litre four-cylinder for the BRM P25 Formula One car. Tresilian subsequently designed the BRM P48, BRM's first rear-engined Formula One car.

References

External links
 Biography at grandprix.com
 

1904 births
1962 deaths
Armstrong Siddeley
British mechanical engineers
Rolls-Royce people
Alumni of the University of Cambridge